Annett Renneberg (born 16 March 1978, in Rudolstadt) is a German actress and singer.

Biography

Early life and education
From the age of two, Renneberg lived in East Berlin, where she later attended high school. She also took lessons in singing, piano and accordion, and aspired to a career as an opera singer.

Career
In 1991, she was discovered at a casting call and landed the lead role in the crime film Die Brut der schönen Seele. In 1995, she played her second major role in the film Maja and was nominated for her performance for a Telestar.

After graduation in 1997, Renneberg wanted to study operatic singing but instead received an offer by director Peter Zadek, for a speaking and singing role in his production of Rise and Fall of the City of Mahagonny at the Salzburg Festival. Renneberg discovered her love of the theater, and other stage engagements followed in the next few years, mainly working with Peter Zadek. Renneberg has also played in more than 50 TV and cinema productions. She played the role of Signorina Elettra Zorzi in the film adaptations of Donna Leon's Commissario Brunetti novels.

Since 2006, she performs her own stage programs, and sings, recites, and performs with various other artists. From 2009 to 2011, she played the role of Senior Commissioner Catharina Brandt in Stolberg.

Personal life
Annett Renneberg has lived in Mecklenburg-Vorpommern since summer 2014.

Theater
 1998: Aufstieg und Fall der Stadt Mahagonny von Bertolt Brecht, Rolle: Erzähler und Mädchen – Regie: Peter Zadek, Salzburger Festspiele
 1999–2006: Hamlet von William Shakespeare, Rolle: Ophelia und Fortinbras – Regie: Peter Zadek, Wiener Festwochen
 2004–2005: Lina von Markus Hille, Rolle: Lina – Regie: Uwe Eric Laufenberg, premiere, Hans Otto Theater Potsdam
 2004–2008: Peer Gynt von Henrik Ibsen, Rolle: Solveig – Regie: Peter Zadek, Berliner Ensemble
 2008: Nackt by Luigi Pirandello, Rolle: Ersilia – Regie: Peter Zadek, Dt. Uraufführung, St.-Pauli-Theater Hamburg
 2008: Siegfrieds Frauen und Die letzten Tage von Burgund, Rolle: Kriemhild, Nibelungenfestspiele in Worms – Regie: Dieter Wedel

Film
 1999: Hinter dem Regenbogen, directed by Jan Peter
 2000: Der Atemkünstler, directed by Marco Kreuzpaintner
 2003: Devot, directed by Igor Zaritzki
 2003: Befreite Zone, directed by Norbert Baumgarten
 2004: Schatten, directed by Markus Engel
 2004: Erbsen auf halb 6, directed by Lars Büchel
 2005: Marie, directed by Alexandre Powelz

Television
 1992: Die Brut der schönen Seele, directed by Rainer Behrend
 1996: Maja, directed by Volker Maria Arend
 1997: Das Böse, directed by Christian Görlitz
 1997: , directed by Ralf Huettner
 1997: Blutige Scheidung, directed by Manuel Siebenmann
 1997: Ein Fall für zwei – Ende einer Täuschung, directed by Bodo Fürneisen
 1998: Francis, directed by Angelika Mönning
 1999: Kommissar Rex – Der Verlierer, directed by Michi Riebl
 2000: Donna Leon – Vendetta, directed by Christian von Castelberg
 2000: Donna Leon – Venezianische Scharade, directed by Christian von Castelberg
 2000: Models, directed by Mark von Seydlitz
 2001: Kolle – Ein Leben für Liebe und Sex, directed by Susanne Zanke
 2001: Tatort – Der Präsident, directed by Thomas Bohn
 2001: Engel sucht Flügel, directed by Marek Gierszal
 2001: , directed by Dietmar Klein
 2001: Zwei Brüder – Abschied, directed by Andy Bausch
 2002: Ein starkes Team – Kollege Mörder, directed by Peter F. Bringmann
 2002: Donna Leon – In Sachen Signora Brunetti, directed by Sigi Rothemund
 2002: Donna Leon – Nobiltà, directed by Sigi Rothemund
 2003: Die Cleveren – Engelchen flieg, directed by Christiane Balthasar
 2003: Der letzte Zeuge – Haut aus Eisen, directed by Bernhard Stephan
 2003: Donna Leon – Venezianisches Finale, directed by Sigi Rothemund
 2003: Berlin – Eine Stadt sucht den Mörder, directed by Urs Egger
 2003: Donna Leon – Feine Freunde, directed by Sigi Rothemund
 2004: Donna Leon – Sanft entschlafen, directed by Sigi Rothemund
 2004: Donna Leon – Acqua alta, directed by Sigi Rothemund
 2004: Die Cleveren – Auf der Flucht, directed by Christiane Balthasar
 2004: Die Cleveren – Killer im Kopf, directed by Christiane Balthasar
 2005: Unter weißen Segeln – Odyssee der Herzen
 2005: Donna Leon – Beweise, dass es böse ist, directed by Sigi Rothemund
 2005: Donna Leon – Verschwiegene Kanäle, directed by Sigi Rothemund
 2005: Tatort – Rache-Engel, directed by Robert Sigl
 2006: Tatort – Unter Kontrolle, directed by René Heisig
 2006: Tatort – Feuerkämpfer, directed by Thomas Bohn
 2006: Donna Leon – Endstation Venedig, directed by Sigi Rothemund
 2006: Donna Leon – Das Gesetz der Lagune, directed by Sigi Rothemund
 2007: Die Wölfe, directed by Friedemann Fromm
 2007: Reife Leistung!, directed by Martin Gies
 2008: Donna Leon – Die dunkle Stunde der Serenissima, directed by Sigi Rothemund
 2008: Donna Leon – Blutige Steine, directed by Sigi Rothemund
 2009: 
 2009: Donna Leon – Wie durch ein dunkles Glas, directed by Sigi Rothemund
 2009: Rahel – Eine preussische Affäre, directed by Catharina Deus
 2009–2012: Stolberg (19 episodes)
 2010: Unter anderen Umständen: Tod im Kloster
 2010: Donna Leon – Lasset die Kinder zu mir kommen
 2011: Donna Leon – Das Mädchen seiner Träume
 2012: Donna Leon – Schöner Schein
 2013: Donna Leon – Auf Treu und Glauben
 2014: Donna Leon – Reiches Erbe
 2015: Donna Leon – Tierische Profite
 2016: Donna Leon – Das goldene Ei
 Since 2017 In aller Freundschaft (TV Series)Awards
 1997: Nominierung für den Telestar (Beste Darstellerin in einem Fernsehspiel) für Maja 2002: Lilli-Palmer-Gedächtniskamera (Beste Nachwuchsdarstellerin)
 2003: Vornominierung für den Deutschen Filmpreis als beste Schauspielerin für ihre Rolle in Devot''

References

External links
 
 
 
 
 
 
 

1978 births
German actresses
Living people
East German actors
East German women
People from East Berlin
Actresses from Berlin
20th-century German women